Paul Ballard may refer to:

 Paul Ballard (rugby league) (born 1984), English rugby player
 Paul 'Des' Ballard (born 1982), English TV presenter
 Paul Ballard (soccer) (born 1983), Canadian soccer player
 Paul Ballard (Dollhouse), fictional character on Dollhouse played by Tahmoh Penikett